The Ramakrishna Order (Bengali: রামকৃষ্ণ সংঘ) is the monastic lineage that was founded by Sri Ramakrishna, when he gave the ochre cloth of renunciation to twelve of his close disciples, in January 1886 at the Cossipore House.

The Ramakrishna Order should not be confused with the Ramakrishna Math, which is the legal entity that trains young monks and directs the spiritual duties of the Swamis of the Order. There is also a parallel organization, the Ramakrishna Mission, which performs the charitable work including, orphanages, hospitals, clinics, primary schools, high schools, colleges, and universities - as well as disaster relief and economic development in villages.

Information
The Ramakrishna Order is the monastic lineage that gave birth to the twin organizations Ramakrishna Math and Ramakrishna Mission, both headquartered at Belur Math near Kolkata, India. The organizations were inspired by the great Bengali saint, Sri Ramakrishna. Sri Ramakrishna was born in the year of 1836.  Ramakrishna decided to entrust his young disciples to Swami Vivekananda. Vivekananda then founded the Ramakrishna Math in the year of 1897. The Ramakrishna Mission was set up as a parallel organization to carry out the practice of "Worship of God in man".

There are over 166 centers associated with the Ramakrishna Order that are located on the Indian subcontinent, Europe, Russia, Japan, South America, Africa, Canada and the United States. Ramakrishna Mission tries to provide relief and aid from famine, epidemic, fire, flood, earthquake, cyclone, and communal disturbances.

The seal of the Ramakrishna Order
The seal of Ramakrishna includes certain symbols that depict their idea for the four paths to God. It includes wavy waters that means unselfish work, the lotus means the love of God, the rising sun means knowledge, and the encompass serpent means the awakening of spiritual powers.

See also
Ramakrishna Mission
Ramakrishna Math
Sri Sarada Math

References

External links
Official Website of the Headquarters of Ramakrishna Math and Ramakrishna Mission (Belur Math)

Ramakrishna Mission
Hindu religious orders